The UK Rock & Metal Singles Chart is a record chart which ranks the best-selling rock and heavy metal songs in the United Kingdom. Compiled and published by the Official Charts Company, the data is based on each track's weekly physical sales, digital downloads and streams. In 2010, there were 17 singles that topped the 52 published charts. The first number-one single of the year was "Killing in the Name" by American rap metal band Rage Against the Machine, which topped the chart during the final week of 2009 and remained at number one for the first two weeks of 2010. The final number-one of the year was "Ace of Spades" by Motörhead.

The most successful song on the UK Rock & Metal Singles Chart in 2010 was "Closer to the Edge" by Thirty Seconds to Mars, which spent eight consecutive weeks at number one between 17 July and 4 September. "Make Me Wanna Die" by The Pretty Reckless spent seven consecutive weeks at number one prior to this, while Paramore's "The Only Exception" was number one for six straight weeks earlier in the year. "Where We Belong" by Lostprophets was number one for five consecutive weeks, while Muse spent five weeks at number one with two songs – "Resistance" for three weeks and "Feeling Good" for two. "Na Na Na (Na Na Na Na Na Na Na Na Na)" by My Chemical Romance spent four weeks atop the chart, while singles by Goo Goo Dolls, Muse, Guns N' Roses and Linkin Park each spent three weeks at number one.

Chart history

See also
2010 in British music
List of UK Rock & Metal Albums Chart number ones of 2010

References

External links
Official UK Rock & Metal Singles Chart Top 40 at the Official Charts Company
The Official UK Top 40 Rock Singles at BBC Radio 1

2010 in British music
United Kingdom Rock and Metal Singles
2010